Bharati Ray (née Sengupta ; born 26 July 1934) is an Indian politician. She was elected to the Rajya Sabha the Upper house of Indian Parliament from West Bengal as a member of the Communist Party of India (Marxist).

References

1934 births
Living people
Communist Party of India (Marxist) politicians from West Bengal
Rajya Sabha members from West Bengal
People from New Delhi